Fort Apache Napoli is a 2009 Italian biographical film directed by Marco Risi about the fight against the Camorra and subsequent assassination of journalist Giancarlo Siani, played by Libero De Rienzo.

Plot
The film tells the story of Giancarlo Siani, a young Neapolitan journalist who works in the editorial room of Il Mattino in Torre Annunziata. He works the crime beat. While writing about crimes and murders by the Camorra, Siani begins to investigate the Camorra's alliances with the politicians of Torre Annunziata, and to discover large areas of corruption and collusion between politicians and organized crime.

Despite the somewhat veiled threats of the local political class, Siani continues his inquiries, especially after the "massacre of the circle of fishermen". His articles particularly annoy the local Camorra bosses because they undermine their political and criminal alliances mainly with the Valentino Gionta's arrest. After he is transferred to Naples by his paper, the Camorra meet and decide to kill Siani. Siani is shot outside his girlfriend's house, in the residential district of Vomero, on 23 September 1985. Siani was 26 years old.

Cast

Soundtrack
The soundtrack includes the following tracks:
—Vasco Rossi
—Edoardo Bennato
—Ciro Capano
—Ciro Capano
—Ciro Capano
—Pino Daniele
—R. De Simone
—Franco Battiato
—Nino D'Angelo
—performed by Antonio Buonomo
—performed by Mario Abbate
—performed by Antonio Buonomo
Nocturne from String Quartet No. 2 in D Major  by A. Borodin—performed by the Pessoa Quartet (I Kyung Lee, Marco Quaranta, Rita Gucci, Achilles Taddeo)
—Pino Daniele
River runs deep—JJ Cale
—Mammoliti, Mambelli, Di Carlo, Poggiani
—performed by Luis Miguel

Accolades

References

External links
 

2009 films
Italian biographical drama films
2000s Italian-language films
Biographical films about journalists
Films about the Camorra
Films directed by Marco Risi
Films set in 1985
Films about corruption
Films set in Naples